Mario Ćuže (born 24 April 1999) is a Croatian professional footballer who plays as a winger for Bosnian Premier League club Zrinjski Mostar, on loan from Dinamo Zagreb.

Club career

Dinamo Zagreb
Born in Metković, Dubrovnik-Neretva County, Ćuže progressed through the youth system of Dinamo Zagreb.

Istra 1961 (loan)
In 2019, Ćuže was sent on loan to Istra 1961 in the Croatian First Football League. He made his professional debut with the club on 26 July 2019, against Inter Zaprešić in the domestic league. Starting as a left winger that day, he stood out by scoring a brace, securing a 2–0 away win. On 3 August, only his second game, Ćuže scored a hat-trick in a 3–1 win over Varaždin, bringing his tally to five goals in only two professional appearances.

Lokomotiva (loan)
In August 2020, Ćuže was sent on loan to Lokomotiva for one season, but returned to Dinamo in October.

Dnipro-1 (loan)
In February 2021, Ćuže joined Ukrainian Premier League club Dnipro-1 on loan until the end of the season. He made his debut eight days later in a 2–0 win against Inhulets Petrove. He scored his first two goals for the club on 23 March to secure a 2–0 away win over Desna Chernihiv.

In July 2021, the deal was extended to a loan until 31 January 2022, as he faced tough competition in his position at Dinamo.

Ćuže spent the remainder of the 2021–22 season playing in the second division for Druga NL team Dinamo Zagreb II. On 2 May 2022, he scored one goal and provided an assist in a match against Dubrava that ended in a 3–1 victory.

Zrinjski Mostar (loan)
On 13 June 2022, he was sent on loan to Bosnian Premier League club Zrinjski Mostar. He made his debut for the club on 6 July, starting in the UEFA Champions League qualifier against Sheriff Tiraspol. On 28 July, Ćuže scored his first goal for Zrinjski in the UEFA Europa Conference League win over KF Tirana. His club eventually made it to the play-off round, where they lost on penalties to Slovan Bratislava.

International career
Ćuže gained his first cap for the Croatia under-21 team on 5 September 2019 against the United Arab Emirates in a friendly match. His team won by a score of 3–0. On 11 October 2019, he made first assist during a 4–1 friendly win over Hungary.

Honours
Dinamo Zagreb
Croatian First Football League: 2019–20

References

External links 

1999 births
Living people
Sportspeople from Metković
Association football forwards
Croatian footballers
Croatia youth international footballers
Croatia under-21 international footballers
GNK Dinamo Zagreb players
GNK Dinamo Zagreb II players
NK Istra 1961 players
NK Lokomotiva Zagreb players
SC Dnipro-1 players
HŠK Zrinjski Mostar players
Croatian Football League players
First Football League (Croatia) players
Ukrainian Premier League players
Premier League of Bosnia and Herzegovina players
Croatian expatriate footballers
Expatriate footballers in Ukraine
Croatian expatriate sportspeople in Ukraine
Expatriate footballers in Bosnia and Herzegovina
Croatian expatriate sportspeople in Bosnia and Herzegovina